The 2020–21 season is UANL's fourth competitive season and fourth season in the Liga MX Femenil, the top flight of Mexican women's football.

Due to the COVID-19 pandemic, Liga MX Femenil's start was delayed for August 2020.

Squad

Apertura
{| class="wikitable" style="text-align:center; font-size:100%;"
|-
! style=background-color:#F9D600;color:#0E77CA| No.
! style=background-color:#F9D600;color:#0E77CA| Nat.
! style=background-color:#F9D600;color:#0E77CA| Name
! style=background-color:#F9D600;color:#0E77CA| Date of birth (Age)
! style=background-color:#F9D600;color:#0E77CA| Since
|-
! colspan="5" style="background:#0E77CA; color:#F9D600; text-align:center;" | Goalkeepers
|-
| 1 ||  || align=left| Alejandra Gutiérrez ||  || 2018
|-
| 20 ||  || align=left| Ofelia Solís ||  || 2017
|-
| 33 ||  || align=left| Vania Villalobos ||  || 2018
|-
| 34 ||  || align=left| Karla Zozaya ||  || 2020
|-
! colspan="5" style="background:#0E77CA; color:#F9D600; text-align:center;" | Defenders
|-
| 2 ||  || align=left| Akemi Yokoyama ||  || 2017
|-
| 3 ||  || align=left| Bianca Sierra ||  || 2020
|-
| 4 ||  || align=left| Greta Espinoza ||  || 2018
|-
| 13 ||  || align=left| Karen Luna ||  || 2017
|-
| 15 ||  || align=left| Cristina Ferral ||  || 2018
|-
| 17 ||  || align=left| Natalia Villarreal ||  || 2017
|-
| 22 ||  || align=left| Selene Cortés ||  || 2017
|-
| 31 ||  || align=left| Natalia Miramontes ||  || 2018
|-
| 35 ||  || align=left| Angélica Murillo ||  || 2020
|-
! colspan="5" style="background:#0E77CA; color:#F9D600; text-align:center;" | Midfielders
|-
| 6 ||  || align=left| Nancy Antonio ||  || 2017
|-
| 7 ||  || align=left| Liliana Mercado (Captain) ||  || 2017
|-
| 11 ||  || align=left| Nayeli Rangel  ||  || 2017
|-
| 14 ||  || align=left| Lizbeth Ovalle ||  || 2017
|-
| 18 ||  || align=left| Belén Cruz ||  || 2017
|-
| 21 ||  || align=left| Natalia Gómez Junco ||  || 2019
|-
| 32 ||  || align=left| Mariana Elizondo ||  || 2017
|-
! colspan="5" style="background:#0E77CA; color:#F9D600; text-align:center;" | Forwards
|-
| 5 ||  || align=left| Fernanda Elizondo ||  || 2018
|-
| 9 ||  || align=left| Stephany Mayor ||  || 2020
|-
| 10 ||  || align=left| Katty Martínez ||  || 2017
|-
| 19 ||  || align=left| Blanca Solís ||  || 2017
|-
| 25 ||  || align=left| Azucena Martínez ||  || 2020
|-
| 30 ||  || align=left| Miah Zuazua ||  || 2019
|-
| 36 ||  || align=left| Yenifer García ||  || 2020

Transfers

In

Out

Coaching staff

Competitions

Overview

Torneo Apertura

League table

Matches

Playoffs

Quarterfinals

Semifinals

Final

Torneo Clausura

League table

Matches

Playoffs

Quarterfinals

Statistics

Goalscorers

Own goals

References

Tigres UANL (women) seasons
Mexican football clubs 2020–21 season